Jeff Bruce (born 9 November 1973) is a former Australian rules footballer who played for Fitzroy in the Australian Football League (AFL) in 1995. He was recruited from the Corowa-Rutherglen Football Club in the Ovens & Murray Football League (OMFL) with the 58th selection in the 1993 AFL Draft.

He later moved to Western Australia where he played for West Perth Football Club in the West Australian Football League (WAFL), leading the club's goal kicking in 1999.

References

External links

Living people
1973 births
Fitzroy Football Club players
West Perth Football Club players
Corowa-Rutherglen Football Club players
Australian rules footballers from Victoria (Australia)